Puka Urqu (Quechua puka red, urqu mountain, "red mountain", Hispanicized spelling Puca Orco) is a mountain in the Wansu mountain range in the Andes of Peru, about  high. It is situated in the Apurímac Region, Antabamba Province, Oropesa District. Puka Urqu lies west of Hatunqullpa and northeast of Millu.

References 

Mountains of Peru
Mountains of Apurímac Region